Palaikythro is a village in the Nicosia District of Cyprus, located 6 km south of Kythrea, on the main Nicosia-Famagusta highway. The village is under de facto control of Northern Cyprus.

References

Communities in Nicosia District
Populated places in Lefkoşa District